The second USS Rondo (ID-2488) was a United States Navy cargo ship in commission from 1918 to 1919.

SS Rondo was built in 1914 at Rotterdam in the Netherlands by Rotterdam Droogdock Maatschappij as a commercial cargo ship for the Dutch steamship company Nederland Stoomvaart Maatschappij. In March 1918, she was among 89 Dutch ships the United States Customs Service seized for World War I use by the United States. The U.S. Navys 3rd Naval District inspected her for possible naval service on 25 March 1918.  She was transferred to the U.S. Navy in late March 1918, and became one of 31 of the formerly Dutch ships to enter U.S. naval service when she was assigned naval registry Identification Number (Id. No.) 2488 and commissioned as USS Rondo on 28 March 1918.

Assigned to the Naval Overseas Transportation Service, Rondo departed New York City on 12 April 1918 for Norfolk, Virginia, where she loaded United States Army supplies for U.S. forces in Europe. Rondo subsequently made two round-trip voyages in convoy across the Atlantic Ocean between 7 May 1918 and 5 September 1918, unloading cargo at La Pallice, Le Verdon-sur-Mer, and Bordeaux, France.

Rondo was fitted for service as a horse transport during September 1918 under United States Shipping Board account. As an animal transport, she made one voyage to Montevideo, Uruguay, arriving there on 16 February 1919. Returning northward to Boston, Massachusetts, to unload her cargo, Rondo later was assigned duty carrying food to Europe. After engine trouble once forced her back into port, Rondo reached Falmouth, England, on 28 May 1919.

Steaming on to Amsterdam, the Netherlands, Rondo was decommissioned and returned to Nederland Stoomvaart Maatschappij on 21 June 1919.

Once again SS Rondo, she remained in commercial service with Nederland Stoomvaart Maatschappij until scrapped during 1933.

References

Department of the Navy: Naval Historical Center Online Library of Selected Images: U.S. Navy Ships: USS Rondo (ID # 2488), 1918-1919. Originally S.S. Rondo (Dutch Freighter, 1914)
NavSource Online: Section Patrol Craft Photo Archive: Rondo (ID 2488)

World War I cargo ships of the United States
Ships built in Rotterdam
1914 ships
Cargo ships of the United States Navy